The carline skipper (Pyrgus carlinae) is a butterfly and a species of the skipper (family Hesperiidae). It is only found in southwestern areas of the Alps and can be an abundant species within this restricted range.

As with most Pyrgus species, the carline skipper can be difficult to identify in the field. The dark brown upper forewings are marked with relatively small white markings but can usually be separated from the olive skipper (Pyrgus serratulae) by a c-shaped white mark close to the costa and the reddish-brown, not olive green, colour of the under hindwings, with a large square pale spot close to the margin. The wingspan is 26–28 mm. The adults are on the wing from June to August.

The larval food plant is spring cinquefoil.

References 

 Whalley, Paul - Mitchell Beazley Guide to Butterflies (1981, reprinted 1992)

External links 
 Barcodes of life
 Fauna Europaea
 Guy Padfield's European Butterfly Page
 Lepiforum.de

Pyrgus
Butterflies of Europe
Butterflies described in 1839
Taxa named by Jules Pierre Rambur